Pleasant Valley Township is one of twenty townships in Fayette County, Iowa, USA.  As of the 2010 census, its population was 1,002.

Geography
According to the United States Census Bureau, Pleasant Valley Township covers an area of 36.67 square miles (94.99 square kilometers); of this, 36.64 square miles (94.89 square kilometers, 99.89 percent) is land and 0.04 square miles (0.1 square kilometers, 0.11 percent) is water.

Cities, towns, villages
 Elgin

Unincorporated towns
 Brainard at 

(This list is based on USGS data and may include former settlements.)

Adjacent townships
 Clermont Township (north)
 Grand Meadow Township, Clayton County (northeast)
 Marion Township, Clayton County (east)
 Highland Township, Clayton County (southeast)
 Illyria Township (south)
 Westfield Township (southwest)
 Union Township (west)
 Dover Township (northwest)

Cemeteries
The township contains these three cemeteries: Brainard, Elgin and God's Acres.

Major highways
  U.S. Route 18
  Iowa Highway 56

School districts
 North Fayette Valley Community School District

Political districts
 Iowa's 1st congressional district
 State House District 24
 State Senate District 12

References
 United States Census Bureau 2008 TIGER/Line Shapefiles
 United States Board on Geographic Names (GNIS)
 United States National Atlas

External links
 US-Counties.com
 City-Data.com

Townships in Fayette County, Iowa
Townships in Iowa